The 2016 Singapore Sevens was the eighth tournament of the 2015–16 World Rugby Sevens Series. The tournament was played on 16–17 April 2016 at National Stadium in Singapore. It was the fourth time the Singapore Sevens was part of the World Sevens Series, having last hosted an event on the circuit in 2006.

Format
Sixteen teams are drawn into four pools of four teams each. Each team plays each of the other teams their pool once. The top two teams from each pool advance to the Cup/Plate brackets. The bottom two teams from each group go to the Bowl/Shield brackets.

Teams
The 16 participating teams for the tournament:

Pool stages

Pool A

Pool B

Pool C

Pool D

Knockout stage

Shield

Bowl

Plate

Cup

External links
Official Site

Singapore Sevens
S
2016 in Singaporean sport
April 2016 sports events in Asia